Laura López Valle (born 24 April 1988) is a Spanish synchronized swimmer.

She competed in the women's team event at the 2008 Summer Olympics where she won a silver medal.

Notes

References

External links 
 
 
 
 

1988 births
Living people
Spanish synchronized swimmers
Olympic synchronized swimmers of Spain
Olympic medalists in synchronized swimming
Olympic silver medalists for Spain
Synchronized swimmers at the 2008 Summer Olympics
Medalists at the 2008 Summer Olympics